Ships of the Royal Navy is a naval history reference work by J. J. Colledge (1908–1997); it provides brief entries on all recorded ships in commission in the Royal Navy from the 15th century, giving location of constructions, date of launch, tonnage, specification and fate.

It was published in two volumes by Greenhill Books. Volume 1, first published in 1969, covers major ships; Volume 2, first published in 1970, covers Navy-built trawlers, drifters, tugs and requisitioned ships including Armed Merchant Cruisers.

The book is the standard single-volume reference work on ships of the Royal Navy, and Colledge's conventions and spellings of names are used by museums, libraries and archives. For more data on ships of the pre-1863 Royal Navy, see British Warships in the Age of Sail.

A revised third version of the Volume 1 work was published in 2003 which added the ships of the late 20th century. The revision was conducted by Ben Warlow. A fourth edition was published in 2006, reinstating some of the smaller vessels that the third edition had omitted.  A further revised fourth edition was published in 2010 to include requisitioned ships, e.g. Armed merchant cruisers, Merchant aircraft carriers, as well as small craft, e.g. landing craft and Admiralty-built trawlers.

References

 
 

 
1969 non-fiction books
1970 non-fiction books
Books about the Royal Navy
Nautical reference works
20th-century history books